Duwaine Whitfield, better known by the stage name Wittyboy, is a British DJ, record producer and remixer from Leeds, West Yorkshire, England.

Early life
Whitfield was raised in Leeds where he was influenced by a mix of speed garage, grime, hip hop, house and dancehall from an early age. He began to gain support on national radio stations along with regular nightclub performances within the bassline scene.

Music career
After a number of successful underground releases, Wittyboy was given his first major label opportunity, remixing singer Estelle's "No Substitute Love" (Atlantic Records). Wittyboy continued to grow his remix portfolio working with the likes of Nitin Sawhney featuring Roxanne Tataei on his remix of "Distant Dreams" (Cooking Vinyl), followed by his remix of Craig David's "Are You Up for This"< (Ice Cream Records) and Jodie Aysha's "Pozer (Zer Zer Zer)" (All Around the World Productions). Wittyboy has been featured on a number of compilations such as Nitin Sawhney's London Undersound and Instrumentals, Pure Garage Rewind: Back to the Old Skool and Pure Bassline, both mixed by DJ EZ (Warner Music UK), Ministry of Sound's The Sound of Bassline series and Fabric Live 47. Wittyboy has been featured in numerous publications such as ComplexVibrations Magazine, DJ Mag, issue 80 of RWD Magazine, and Zap Bang Magazine.

Discography

Compilation album appearances

EPs 
 Witty Boy EP, Northern Line Records (2007)
 Danger EP, Northern Line Records (2007)
 Music Hustler EP, Music Hustler Records (2007)
 So Happy & Seductive, Illusive Entertainment (2008)
 Broken Silence EP, Wittyboy Music (2013)
 The Shakedown EP, Chip Butty Records (2016)
 Narcos EP, Wittyboy Music (2019)

Singles 
 "Kiss My Eyes" (2007)
 "Conversations" (2007)
 "Bad Dreams" (2007)
 "Iron Man" (2007)
 "Murder Charge" (2007)
 "Nacho Riddim" (2007)
 "Iron Man VIP" (2007)
 "Spanish Rose" (2007)
 "Attention" (2008)
 "Stupid Games" (2008)
 "Danger" (2008)
 "World War 3" (2008)
 "So Happy" (2008)
 "Seductive" (2008)
 "Hungry Giant" (2008)
 "Bubble & Tweak" (2013)
 "Running to You" (2013)
 "Without You" (2013)
 "The Shakedown" (2016)
 "Warlord" (2016)
 "Backup Plan" (2016)

Remixes 
 Mutya Buena – "Just a Little Bit" (Wittyboy Remix) (2007)
 Craig David – "Are You Up for This" (Wittyboy Remix) (2008)
 Craig David feat. Tinchy Stryder – "Where's Your Love" (Wittyboy Remix) (2008)
 Sticky featuring Courtney Dennie – "I'm in Love" (Wittyboy Remix) (2008)
 Ear Dis – "I Feel" (Wittyboy Remix) (2008)
 Roll Deep feat. Janee – "Do Me Wrong" (Wittyboy Remix) (2008)
 Spoonface – "Pon Me Sofa" (Wittyboy Remix)  (2008)
 Nitin Sawhney – "Distant Dreams" (feat. Roxanne Tataei) (Wittyboy Remix) (2008)
 Estelle – "No Substitute Love" (Wittyboy Remix) (2008)
 Leon Jean-Marie – "Bring It On" (Wittyboy Remix) (2008)
 Cotti feat. Doctor – "Calm Down" (Wittyboy Remix) (2008)
 DJ Matchstick & Erica Iji – "It's Over" (Wittyboy Remix) (2008)
 Alex Mills – "Beyond Words" (Wittyboy Remix) (2008)
 Toddla T & Herve feat. Serocee – "Shake It" (Wittyboy Remix) (2009)
 East 17 vs Witty Boy – "Trouble" (2009)
 Rainboy – "Woman of the Wind" (Wittyboy Remix) (2009)
 Lauren Mason - "P.S" (Wittyboy Remix) (2009)
 Jodie Aysha – "Pozer (Zer Zer Zer)" (Wittyboy Remix) (2010)
 I Haunt Wizards – "Flowers Bloom" (Wittyboy Remix) (2010)
 Serocee – "Oh Na Na" (Wittyboy Remix) (2011)

References

English DJs
English record producers
1984 births
Living people
Musicians from Leeds
Electronic dance music DJs